Zamboanga del Sur's 2nd congressional district is one of the two congressional districts of the Philippines in the province of Zamboanga del Sur. It has been represented in the House of Representatives since 1987. The district encompasses the southern half of the province consisting of the municipalities of Bayog, Dimataling, Dinas, Dumalinao, Guipos, Kumalarang, Lakewood, Lapuyan, Margosatubig, Pitogo, San Miguel, San Pablo, Tabina, Tigbao and Vincenzo A. Sagun. It is currently represented in the 18th Congress by Leonardo Babasa Jr. of the PDP–Laban.

Representation history

Election results

2019

Incumbent Aurora Enerio-Cerilles will run for governor of Zamboanga del Sur. Her husband three-term governor Antonio Cerilles switched places as her party's nominee for the district's seat.

2016

Aurora Enerio-Cerilles is the incumbent.

2013

Aurora Enerio-Cerilles was the incumbent.

2010

Incumbent Antonio Cerilles will run for governor of Zamboanga del Sur. His wife three-term governor Aurora Enerio-Cerilles is his party's nominee for the district's seat.

See also
Legislative districts of Zamboanga del Sur

References

Congressional districts of the Philippines
Politics of Zamboanga del Sur
1987 establishments in the Philippines
Congressional districts of Zamboanga Peninsula
Constituencies established in 1987